was the 9th king of the Ryukyu Kingdom, who ruled from 1641 to 1647.

Shō Ken was the third son of Shō Hō. He had two elder brothers named Shō Kyō (尚恭) and Shō Bun (尚文), but both of them died before their father. So Shō Ken became the heir apparent of the kingdom, and was given Kume and Nakagusuku magiri as his domain. After Shō Hō's death, Shō Ken was installed as the king.

Many of the Sakishima Beacons were built during his reign.

References

Second Shō dynasty
Kings of Ryūkyū
1625 births
1647 deaths